John Bright Russell (January 23, 1940 – July 3, 2001) was an American country singer, songwriter, and comedian best known for his song "Act Naturally", which was made famous by Buck Owens, who recorded it in 1963, and The Beatles in 1965.  His songs have been recorded by Burl Ives, Jim Reeves, Jerry Garcia, Dolly Parton, Emmylou Harris, Loretta Lynn and Linda Ronstadt.

Biography
Born in Moorhead, Mississippi, United States, he moved with his family at age 11 to Fresno, California.  He began writing songs and entering talent contests while still attending Fresno High School, from which he graduated in 1958. He had his first song published that year, "In a Mansion Stands My Love," which was recorded by Jim Reeves as the A-side and B-side of his 1960 hit, "He'll Have to Go."

Russell's recording of his song, "Rednecks, White Socks and Blue Ribbon Beer", was his only top 10 hit, peaking at No. 4 on the Billboard Hot Country Singles chart in October 1973. The song was nominated later that year for a Grammy Award. Russell is also known for hits such as "The Baptism of Jesse Taylor", "Catfish John", and "Hello, I Love You".

Years later, George Strait topped the Billboard Hot Country Songs chart with Russell's song "Let's Fall to Pieces Together".

In 1987, Russell hosted his first annual concert in Moorhead, at the Mississippi Delta Community College Coliseum. These went on for 13 years, his final on April 29, 2000.

By 2001, Russell's health had been in a state of decline (for years, he had used his obesity as a running joke on the Grand Ole Opry), and in April 2001, both of his legs were amputated because of diabetes. Russell died July 3, 2001, in Nashville, Tennessee, at the age of 61 from diabetes-related complications.

Discography

Albums

Singles

References

Bibliography
Roy, Don. (1998). "Johnny Russell." In The Encyclopedia of Country Music. Paul Kingsbury, Ed. New York: Oxford University Press. pp. 462–463.

External links

  CMT.com Biography
 

1940 births
2001 deaths
American country singer-songwriters
Grand Ole Opry members
People from Moorhead, Mississippi
Musicians from Fresno, California
RCA Victor artists
Mercury Records artists
MGM Records artists
Writers from Fresno, California
20th-century American singers
Singer-songwriters from California
Singer-songwriters from Mississippi
Country musicians from California
Country musicians from Mississippi